Perls is a surname. Notable people with the surname include:

Alexander Perls (born 1976), American musician, entrepreneur and record producer
Frank Perls (1910–1975), German-born American art dealer
Fritz Perls (1893–1970), German-born psychiatrist and psychotherapist
Hugo Perls (1886–1977), German art dealer, historian, philosopher
Klaus Perls (1912–2008), German-American art dealer
Laura Perls (1905–1990), German-born psychologist and psychotherapist
Nick Perls (1942–1987), American audio engineer
Tom Perls (born 1960), American gerontologist

See also 
Perls' Prussian blue, a commonly used method in histology, histopathology and clinical pathology
Perl (disambiguation)
Perles (disambiguation)